IsoBase is a database identifying functionally related proteins integrating  sequence data and protein–protein interaction networks.

See also 
 Protein–protein interaction
 Homology (biology)

References

External links
 http://isobase.csail.mit.edu/.

Biological databases
Proteomics
Phylogenetics